The Aeromarine AT (Army Transport) was a proposed passenger biplane from Aeromarine.

Design
The Aeromarine AT was a six-passenger enclosed biplane with an open cockpit for the pilot. The aircraft featured an upper wing with a large nine-foot chord, and a thinner lower wing with a two-foot chord. The cabin featured oval windows with a small overwing cabin door.

Specifications (AT)

References

Aeromarine aircraft